Mount Mahawu is a stratovolcano located immediately east from Lokon-Empung volcano in North Sulawesi, Indonesia. The volcano is capped with 180 m wide and 140 m deep crater with two pyroclastic cones in the northern flanks. A small explosive eruption was recorded in 1789. In 1994, fumaroles, mudpots and small geysers activities were observed along the greenish shore of a crater lake.

See also 

 List of volcanoes in Indonesia

References 

Stratovolcanoes of Indonesia
Mountains of Sulawesi
Volcanoes of Sulawesi
Volcanic crater lakes
Active volcanoes of Indonesia
Landforms of North Sulawesi
Holocene stratovolcanoes